Layin' Low is a 1996 film directed by Danny Leiner and stars Jeremy Piven, Louise Lasser and Edie Falco.

Plot
A New York City loser stumbles upon a mob shootout and ends up with a fat stash of drugs and hides out with a friend's cousin and aunt.

References

External links

1996 films
Films directed by Danny Leiner
1996 comedy films
American comedy films
1996 directorial debut films
1990s English-language films
1990s American films